Barranca de Upía is a town and municipality in the Meta Department, Colombia.

Municipalities of Meta Department